Project 23000E or Shtorm is a proposal for an aircraft carrier designed by the Krylov State Research Center for the Russian Navy. The cost of the export version has been put at over US$5.5 billion, and as of 2017 development had been expected to take ten years. As of 2020, the project had not yet been approved and, given the financial costs, it was unclear whether it would be made a priority over other elements of Russian naval modernisation.

History
The Nevskoye Design Bureau is also reported to be taking part in the development project. Although the creation of a new aircraft carrier, along with the s, has been postponed by Russian President Vladimir Putin, it is still mentioned in the Russia's State Armament Programme for 2018–2027 released in May 2017. According to Russian officials, a new heavy aircraft carrier should be laid down between 2025 and 2030. In 2020, it was reported that, if built, the carrier might also be fitted with the proposed S-500 surface-to-air missiles.

In early July 2016, the design of the aircraft carrier was offered to India for purchase.

See also
List of active Russian Navy ships
List of ships of Russia by project number

References

Aircraft carriers of the Russian Navy
Proposed aircraft carriers